Catchfrench is a hamlet in Cornwall, England.

Catchfrench Manor is a late 18th-century house by Charles Rawlinson of Lostwithiel. It was built on part of the site of the old manor house. In the 20th century the south end of the house was demolished. The ruins of the 16th-century house are to the south.

References

External links

Catchfrench; Historic England
Catchfrench Manor Gardens; Parks & Gardens UK

Hamlets in Cornwall